Borsonella pinosensis is a species of sea snail, a marine gastropod mollusk in the family Borsoniidae.

Description

Distribution
This species occurs in the Pacific Ocean off California.

References

 Bartsch, Paul, and in Mollusks. "The Smithsonian Series."; Smithsonian National Museum of Natural History (1944).
 McLean J.H. (1996). The Prosobranchia. In: Taxonomic Atlas of the Benthic Fauna of the Santa Maria Basin and Western Santa Barbara Channel. The Mollusca Part 2 – The Gastropoda. Santa Barbara Museum of Natural History. volume 9: 1–160
 Turgeon, D. D., J. F. Quinn Jr., A. E. Bogan, E. V. Coan, F. G. Hochberg, W. G. Lyons, et al. 1998. Common and scientific names of aquatic invertebrates from the United States and Canada: Mollusks, 2nd ed. American Fisheries Society Special Publication 26. 526.

External links
 
  Bartsch, P, Some turrid mollusks of Monterey Bay and vicinity; Proceedings of the Biological Society of Washington, v. 57 pp. 57–68

pinosensis
Gastropods described in 1944